Commerce is a city located in southeast Los Angeles County, California, United States. The population was 12,823 at the 2010 census, up from 12,568 at the 2000 census. It is usually referred to as the City of Commerce to distinguish it from the common noun. It is bordered by Vernon on the west, Los Angeles on the northwest, East Los Angeles on the north, Montebello on the east, Downey and Bell Gardens on the south, and Maywood on the southwest. The Los Angeles River forms part of its southwestern boundary, and the Rio Hondo separates it from Downey.  Commerce is served by the Long Beach and Santa Ana freeways, as well as the Metrolink commuter rail service at the Commerce station.

History
In the 19th century, the area was part of Antonio Maria Lugo's Rancho San Antonio.  Its conversion to an industrial area began in 1887, when the Atchison, Topeka and Santa Fe Railway built its main line through the area. The ranch remained intact until Arcadia Bandini de Stearns Baker, reputedly once the wealthiest woman in Los Angeles, sold some of it around the turn of the 20th century.  The Atchison, Topeka and Santa Fe Railway and Los Angeles and Salt Lake Railroad (later the Union Pacific) both were built through what would become the community, as was the Pacific Electric Railway's Whittier Line. By the 1920s, factories had arrived. In the late 1940s, industrial leaders banded together with residents in the communities of Bandini, Rosewood, and Laguna to encourage commerce. They changed the name to match that goal.

The city was incorporated in 1960 to prevent neighboring cities such as Vernon and Los Angeles from annexing industrial land for tax revenue and elected its first city mayor, Maurice Quigley.  In the 1970s and 1980s, Commerce successfully negotiated the turbulent period of deindustrialization that hammered nearby cities such as South Gate and Norwalk, maintaining much of its manufacturing and goods-distribution base and successfully converting former industrial land to lucrative commercial uses.  The most notable example of this phenomenon is the Citadel Outlets mall, which occupies the site of a former tire factory.  The owner of the Citadel, Steve Craig, hosts an annual Clean Up Commerce Day and enlists other businesses to work with the city and volunteers in beautifying a specific area of the city. With a major rail yard within its borders, Commerce has also benefited greatly from the huge expansion in international trade traffic through the ports of Los Angeles and Long Beach, albeit at the expense of severe air pollution caused by truck congestion on the Long Beach Freeway.

Chrysler had an assembly plant in Commerce from 1930 through July 1971 located at 5800 S. Eastern Avenue and Slauson Avenue, called Los Angeles (Maywood) Assembly. It was closed at the end of the 1971 model year, as Chrysler decided to triple-stack its transport trains for the 1972 model year; its Los Angeles facility couldn't accommodate this change.

Commerce is also the site of Williams Ranch, on which is the swimming hole that the Sleepy Lagoon Murder of José Díaz took place in 1942. The Sleepy Lagoon swimming hole was located near Slauson and Eastern Ave.

Geography

Demographics

2010
At the 2010 census Commerce had a population of 12,823. The racial makeup of Commerce was 6,930 (54.0%) White (3.1% Non-Hispanic White), 96 (0.7%) African American, 161 (1.3%) Native American, 140 (1.1%) Asian, 9 (0.1%) Pacific Islander, 4,886 (38.1%) from other races, and 601 (4.7%) from two or more races. Hispanic or Latino of any race were 12,114 persons (94.5%).

The census reported that 12,753 people (99.5% of the population) lived in households, 2 (0%) lived in non-institutionalized group quarters, and 68 (0.5%) were institutionalized.

There were 3,382 households, 1,751 (51.8%) had children under the age of 18 living in them, 1,693 (50.1%) were opposite-sex married couples living together, 708 (20.9%) had a female householder with no husband present, 308 (9.1%) had a male householder with no wife present.  There were 248 (7.3%) unmarried opposite-sex partnerships, and 23 (0.7%) same-sex married couples or partnerships; 559 households (16.5%) were one person and 326 (9.6%) had someone living alone who was 65 or older. The average household size was 3.77.  There were 2,709 families (80.1% of households); the average family size was 4.17.

The age distribution was 3,824 people (29.8%) under the age of 18, 1,458 people (11.4%) aged 18 to 24, 3,581 people (27.9%) aged 25 to 44, 2,590 people (20.2%) aged 45 to 64, and 1,370 people (10.7%) who were 65 or older.  The median age was 31.2 years. For every 100 females, there were 96.4 males.  For every 100 females age 18 and over, there were 92.7 males.

There were 3,470 housing units at an average density of 530.8 per square mile, of the occupied units 1,619 (47.9%) were owner-occupied and 1,763 (52.1%) were rented. The homeowner vacancy rate was 1.0%; the rental vacancy rate was 1.8%.  6,631 people (51.7% of the population) lived in owner-occupied housing units and 6,122 people (47.7%) lived in rental housing units.

According to the 2010 United States Census, Commerce had a median household income of $48,729, with 16.5% of the population living below the federal poverty line.

2000
At the 2000 census there were 12,568 people in 3,284 households, including 2,686 families, in the city. The population density was 1,913.6 inhabitants per square mile (738.6/km). The racial makeup of the city was 44.8% White, 0.8% Black or African American, 1.6% Native American, 1.08% Asian, 0.1% Pacific Islander, 46.9% from other races, and 4.8% from two or more races.  93.6% of the population were Hispanic or Latino of any race. Of the 3,284 households 47.3% had children under the age of 18 living with them, 54.3% were married couples living together, 19.9% had a female householder with no husband present, and 18.2% were non-families; 15.5% of households were one person and 9.2% were one person aged 65 or older. The average household size was 3.80 and the average family size was 4.17.

The age distribution was 33.8% under the age of 18, 11.1% from 18 to 24, 28.8% from 25 to 44, 16.1% from 45 to 64, and 10.2% 65 or older.  The median age was 28 years. For every 100 females, there were 96.5 males.  For every 100 females age 18 and over, there were 93.3 males.

The median household income was $34,040 and the median family income was $36,572. Males had a median income of $27,738 versus $22,857 for females. The per capita income for the city was $11,117.  About 15.4% of families and 17.9% of the population were below the poverty line, including 21.8% of those under age 18 and 9.9% of those age 65 or over.

Economy

Principal employers
According to the city's 2010 Comprehensive Annual Financial Report, the top employers in the city are:

Kimlan Foods USA has its headquarters in Commerce.

Government

In the United States House of Representatives, Commerce is in California's 42nd Congressional District, Represented by Democrat Robert Garcia.

Commerce residents have many civic services funded from taxes on the local card club, the Commerce Casino, which accounts for 46% ($19.5 Million for budget year 2005/06) of Commerce's tax revenues, and the Citadel. This includes four libraries, a senior center, a teen center, an aquatics center, and a city-owned camp in the San Bernardino National Forest. Commerce is also one of the few cities in California that provides its residents with free bus service. Commerce operates five bus lines within the city, two routes running Sundays only, and one express bus between The Citadel shopping center and Downtown Los Angeles.

Education 
Most of Commerce is served by Montebello Unified School District, while small portions are served by the Los Angeles Unified School District.

Montebello Unified School District 
Elementary schools that serve Commerce include:

 Bandini Elementary School (Commerce)
 Suva Elementary School (Bell Gardens)

Intermediate schools that serve Commerce include:

 Bell Gardens Intermediate School (Bell Gardens)
 Suva Intermediate School (Bell Gardens)
 La Merced Intermediate School (Montebello)

K–8 schools:

 Rosewood Park School (Commerce)

High schools that serve Commerce include:

 Bell Gardens High School (Bell Gardens)
 Montebello High School (Montebello)
 Schurr High School (Montebello)

Los Angeles Unified School District 
 Ford Boulevard Elementary School (Unincorporated Los Angeles County)
 Griffith Middle School (Unincorporated Los Angeles County)
 Garfield High School (Unincorporated Los Angeles County)

Infrastructure

Health care
The Los Angeles County Department of Health Services operates the Whittier Health Center in Whittier, serving Commerce.

Emergency services

Fire services
Fire protection in Commerce is provided by the Los Angeles County Fire Department, which has its headquarters in Commerce. The LACFD operates Station #22 at 928 South Gerhart Avenue, Station #27, the battalion headquarters, at 6031 Rickenbacker Road, and Station #50 at 2327 South Saybrook Avenue, all in Commerce, as a part of Battalion 3.  Ambulance transport is provided by Care Ambulance Service.

Police services
The Los Angeles County Sheriff's Department (LASD) operates the East Los Angeles Station in East Los Angeles, serving Commerce.

Friendship City
Commerce is a friendship city with Nanning, Guangxi, China.

See also

References

External links

 

 
1960 establishments in California
Chicano and Mexican neighborhoods in California
Cities in Los Angeles County, California
Gateway Cities
Incorporated cities and towns in California
Populated places established in 1960